Athikulam is a neighbourhood in Madurai district of Tamil Nadu state in the peninsular India. CBI office has a branch in Athikulam.

Athikulam area falls under the Madurai East Assembly constituency. The winner of the election held in the year 2021 as the member of its assembly constituency is P. Moorthy. Also, this area belongs to Madurai Lok Sabha constituency. The winner of the election held in the year 2019, as the member of its Lok Sabha constituency is S. Venkatesan.

References 

Neighbourhoods and suburbs of Madurai